Tong sui, also known as tim tong, is a collective term for any sweet, warm soup or custard served as a dessert at the end of a meal in Cantonese cuisine. Tong sui are a Cantonese specialty and many varieties are rarely found in other regional cuisines of China. Outside of Cantonese-speaking communities, soupy desserts generally are not recognized as a distinct category, and the term tong sui is not used.

In Hong Kong,  Macao and Malaysia, a large variety of tong sui is served in tong sui specialty stores. Tong sui stores have also gained prominence in overseas Chinese communities, and are found in various parts of Canada, Australia and the United States.

History

Tong sui shops in Hong Kong mainly originated from the postwar period. Chinese migrants brought their hometown sweet soups to Hong Kong, such as red bean soup from Guangzhou and tang yuan from Shanghai. Newcomers sold tong sui in newly opened street side food stalls and Chinese tea house.

During the 1980s to 1990s, Hong Kong's economy developed rapidly and living standards rose. Western desserts and sweet soups were imported to Hong Kong by Western hotels or cooks who had studied in the West. Under Western influence, people started using fresh fruits to create new-style tong sui such as tapioca pudding. Many Chinese herbal tea shops like Hui Lau Shan transformed into tong sui shops.

In the 21st century, chain tong sui shops have become more prominent and recommended as tourist attractions by The Hong Kong Tourism Board.

Traditional tong sui

Historically, the basic ingredients of traditional sweet soups are beans, milk, and fruits. The desserts and sweet soups provided in the menus of the traditional tong sui shops are mainly the Chinese-style sweet soups. Staples like red bean soup and sweet almond soup are common types of sweet soups sold in the ordinary tong sui shops.

Common varieties

See also

Cantonese desserts
Chè
Compote
Fruit cocktail
Kissel
Kompot
 List of Chinese desserts
 List of Chinese soups
 List of soups
Ching bo leung
Tangyuan (food)

Sources

External links

 Recipe for sweet potato soup
 Various Tong Sui photos on Flickr

Cantonese words and phrases
Chinese desserts
Chinese soups
Cantonese cuisine